Leopold Kalesaran (born 19 September 1931) is an Indonesian sailor. He competed in the Flying Dutchman event at the 1960 Summer Olympics.

References

External links
 

1931 births
Possibly living people
Indonesian male sailors (sport)
Olympic sailors of Indonesia
Sailors at the 1960 Summer Olympics – Flying Dutchman
People from Salatiga
20th-century Indonesian people